Cerro Laguna Verde is one of the many stratovolcanoes that integrate a -long chain east of the Gran Salar de Atacama in Chile's II Region.

Earlier it was considered Pleistocene-Holocene. At some point in the past, the northern flank of the volcano collapsed. The resulting debris avalanche formed a lake in the Quebrada Portor from water dammed by the debris.

Footnotes

See also 
 List of volcanoes in Chile
 San Pedro de Atacama
 Purico Complex

Volcanoes of Antofagasta Region
Stratovolcanoes of Chile
Mountains of Chile
Pleistocene stratovolcanoes